Morrison is a town in southeastern Noble County, Oklahoma, United States. The population was 733 at the 2010 census, an increase from the figure of 636 in 2000.

History
Morrison is located in the former Cherokee Outlet, which was created for the Cherokee Nation in 1835 from former Osage hunting grounds. The Outlet was opened to non-Indian settlement by the Cherokee Strip Land Run in September 1893. The Morrison community emerged in 1894 on land that was once the Osage tribe's hunting grounds.

Roselda Morrison, wife of James Morrison, owned the land upon which the town emerged. Nearby, a man named Autry (for whom the township was named) built a store, which received a postal designation as Autry in 1893.  The post office was renamed Morrison in February 1894, after James Morrison bought the store. Morrison donated  for a town, which was surveyed and platted in August 1894. The town of Morrison incorporated on August 13, 1894.

The Morrison business district moved a short distance south in 1902, when the Arkansas Valley and Western Railroad (after 1907 a part of the St. Louis and San Francisco Railway system, or Frisco,) surveyed its Tulsa-Pawnee-Perry-Enid line. The railroad laid its tracks through the town in the same year. With railroad access, Morrison became an agricultural center, serving ranchers and wheat farmers.

Morrison's economy was enhanced when oil prospectors discovered large natural gas fields in Pawnee County, east of Morrison, between 1915 and 1919. These were the largest fields discovered in Oklahoma up until that time. Pipelines collected the gas and moved it to Oklahoma City. Oil was discovered north of Morrison in 1923. These discoveries protected the town from the post-World War I agricultural depression that affected many other Oklahoma farm towns.

Geography

Demographics

As of the census of 2000, there were 636 people, 255 households, and 179 families residing in the town. There were 274 housing units at an average density of 434.8 per square mile (167.9/km2). The racial makeup of the town was 89.15% White, 0.31% African American, 2.83% Native American, 0.47% Asian, 2.67% from other races, and 4.56% from two or more races. Hispanic or Latino of any race were 4.25% of the population.

There were 255 households, out of which 36.1% had children under the age of 18 living with them, 51.8% were married couples living together, 14.9% had a female householder with no husband present, and 29.8% were non-families. 27.8% of all households were made up of individuals, and 10.6% had someone living alone who was 65 years of age or older. The average household size was 2.49 and the average family size was 3.06.

In the town, the population was spread out, with 29.4% under the age of 18, 8.6% from 18 to 24, 28.6% from 25 to 44, 22.3% from 45 to 64, and 11.0% who were 65 years of age or older. The median age was 34 years. For every 100 females, there were 85.4 males. For every 100 females age 18 and over, there were 80.3 males.

The median income for a household in the town was $28,482, and the median income for a family was $35,417. Males had a median income of $31,618 versus $17,045 for females. The per capita income for the town was $13,393. 15.1% of the population and 13.5% of families were below the poverty line. Out of the total population, 17.6% of those under the age of 18 and 3.7% of those 65 and older were living below the poverty line.

Education

Sports
Morrison is home to the Wildcats, who have won 13 eight-man football state championships and one Class A state championship (08'). (1984, 1986, 1988, 1989, 1990, 1991, 1992, 1993, 1994, 2003, 2005, 2006, 2007, 2008) The Wildcats won 90 consecutive games, from 1988 to 1995.

Points of interest 
 Morrison Arboretum

References

External links
 Morrison High School Home Page

Towns in Noble County, Oklahoma
Towns in Oklahoma
Populated places established in 1894